Daniel John Jolly (April 3, 1907 – September 11, 1990) was an American farmer and politician from the state of Washington. He served in the Washington House of Representatives from 1963 to 1970, and in the Washington Senate from 1970 to 1977.

References

1990 deaths
1907 births
People from Douglas County, Washington
Democratic Party members of the Washington House of Representatives
20th-century American politicians
Democratic Party Washington (state) state senators